Town of Niagara District School No. 2 is a historic One-room school located at Niagara in Niagara County, New York.  It is a one-story frame structure built in 1878.  It operated as a school until 1954, then a school book depository.  In 1980, it became home to the Town of Niagara Historical Society.

It was listed on the National Register of Historic Places in 2005.

References

External links
 Niagara School No2 Museum - Town of Niagara Historical Society

School buildings on the National Register of Historic Places in New York (state)
School buildings completed in 1878
Museums in Niagara County, New York
Education museums in the United States
Historical society museums in New York (state)
National Register of Historic Places in Niagara County, New York
1878 establishments in New York (state)